Abu Ghoveyr Rural District is a rural district (dehestan) in Musian District, Dehloran County, Ilam Province, Iran. At the 2006 census, its population was 1,142, in 190 families.  The rural district has 4 villages.

References 

Rural Districts of Ilam Province
Dehloran County